Génesis was a Colombian folk-rock band, very popular during the 1970s. They are regarded as a significant part of the Colombian social progressive and hippy movements of the time. Génesis is considered a pioneer in fusing rock music with the native folk music of Colombia. Colombian icon Humberto Monroy of Los Speakers was a founding member and driving force behind the band.

Discography 

 Gene-Sis A-Dios, Átomo, 1972
 Génesis, Codiscos, 1974
 Yakta Mama, Codiscos, 1975
 Reuniom, Orbe, 1978
 El paso de Los Andes, CBS, 1981
 En un planeta lejano, CBS, 1982
 A quien/Fuiste un tonto (single, released under the band name "Maíz"), Independent, 1983
 Absolutamente normal, CBS/Discos Diamante, 1987

References 

Colombian rock music groups
Folk rock groups
Musical groups from Bogotá